Baltimore Run is a stream in West Virginia in Webster County.

The community took its name from a pioneer settlement known locally as Baltimore.

See also 
 Cherry Run, West Virginia
 List of rivers of West Virginia

References 

Rivers of Webster County, West Virginia
Rivers of West Virginia